Eirik André Lamøy (born 7 November 1984, in Harstad) is a Norwegian professional football striker who last played for Sandefjord.

Career
He started his career at Harstad, and joined Tromsdalen ahead of the 2004 season. He spent the 2006 season in the Swedish club Degerfors, but returned after that season. Lamøy became the top goalscorer of the 2006 VIVA World Cup with six goals, beside Tom Høgli and Steffen Nystrøm.

In 2007 and 2008, Lamøy was scouted by both Tromsø, Bodø/Glimt and Notodden. In the summer of 2008, he signed for Sandefjord. The transfer took place on 1 January 2009.

Career statistics

References

Norwegian footballers
Tromsdalen UIL players
Degerfors IF players
Sandefjord Fotball players
Norwegian expatriate footballers
Expatriate footballers in Sweden
Norwegian expatriate sportspeople in Sweden
Norwegian Sámi sportspeople
People from Harstad
1984 births
Living people
Harstad IL players
Association football forwards
Sportspeople from Troms og Finnmark